Ricardo "The Mutant" Morais is a Brazilian former mixed martial artist, who competed in Pride Fighting Championships, Jungle Fight, and Rings - MMA. Morais trained with the Banni Fight Combat Jiu-Jitsu  to support, Banni Cavalcanti, even after his last fight in the sport, which was a victory, coming against Tae Hyn Lee at Pride Final Conflict Absolute, 10 September 2006.

Background
Ricardo Morais trained in Brazilian jiu-jitsu and boxing early in his career. Later he began training in Black House with Anderson Silva, Antônio Rodrigo Nogueira

MMA
Morais won 32 fighters tournament "IAFC: Absolute Fighting Championship 1" in Moscow in 1995. Next year he continued his MMA career in Japan at RINGS

Grappling
Morais took part in  ADCC World Championships in 1998, 1999 and 2000. He won silver medal in 1998

The Smashing Machine 
In 2003, HBO aired a documentary titled "The Smashing Machine: The Life and Times of Extreme Fighter Mark Kerr." Morais was shown a lot in this movie leading up to his match against Mark Coleman at Pride 8.

Morais is shown training with Renzo Gracie in the movie.  He lost to Coleman by decision. Morais won a 32-man tournament in Moscow in 1995 that included Pride FC legends Tra Telligman and Igor Vovchachyn. Morais choked out Mikhail Illoukhine in finals.

Championships and accomplishments
Fight Matrix
1995 Rookie of the Year
International Absolute Fighting Championship
IAFC Absolute Fighting Championship 1 Tournament Winner

Mixed martial arts record

|-
| Win
| align=center| 10–4–1
| Lee Tae-Hyun
| TKO (corner stoppage)
| PRIDE FC: Final Conflict Absolute
| 
| align=center| 1
| align=center| 8:08
| Saitama, Japan
| 
|-
| Loss
| align=center| 9–4–1
| Alexander Emelianenko
| KO (punches)
| PRIDE Bushido 6
| 
| align=center| 1
| align=center| 0:15
| Yokohama, Japan
| 
|-
| Loss
| align=center| 9–3–1
| Tsuyoshi Kosaka
| Decision (unanimous)
| NJPW Ultimate Crush II
| 
| align=center| 3
| align=center| 5:00
| Tokyo, Japan
| 
|-
| Win
| align=center| 9–2–1
| Mestre Fumaca
| TKO (punches)
| Jungle Fight 1
| 
| align=center| 1
| align=center| 2:06
| Manaus, Brazil
| 
|-
| Loss
| align=center| 8–2–1
| Mark Coleman
| Decision (unanimous)
| Pride 8
| 
| align=center| 2
| align=center| 10:00
| Tokyo, Japan
| 
|-
| Win
| align=center| 8–1–1
| Hiromitsu Kanehara
| Decision
| Rings: Final Capture
| 
| align=center| 5
| align=center| 5:00
| Japan
| 
|-
| Loss
| align=center| 7–1–1
| Zaza Tkeshelashvili
| Decision
| Rings - Mega Battle Tournament 1997 Semifinal
| 
| align=center| 1
| align=center| 20:00
| Japan
| 
|-
| Win
| align=center| 7–0–1
| Sergio Muralha
| TKO (submission to punches)
| Pentagon Combat
| 
| align=center| 1
| align=center| 0:17
| Brazil
| 
|-
| Draw
| align=center| 6–0–1
| Yuriy Kochkine
| Draw
| Rings - Extension Fighting 4
| 
| align=center| 1
| align=center| 20:00
| Tokyo, Japan
| 
|-
| Win
| align=center| 6–0
| Yoshihisa Yamamoto
| KO (punches)
| Rings - Maelstrom 6
| 
| align=center| 1
| align=center| 0:46
| Japan
| 
|-
| Win
| align=center| 5–0
| Mikhail Illoukhine
| Submission (rear naked choke)
| IAFC: Absolute Fighting Championship 1
| 
| align=center| 1
| align=center| 9:44
| Luzhniki Sports Palace, Moscow, Russia
| 
|-
| Win
| align=center| 4–0
| Victor Yerohin
| TKO (submission to punches)
| IAFC: Absolute Fighting Championship 1
| 
| align=center| 1
| align=center| 1:33
| Luzhniki Sports Palace, Moscow, Russia
| 
|-
| Win
| align=center| 3–0
| Maxim Tarasov
| TKO (submission to punches)
| IAFC: Absolute Fighting Championship 1
| 
| align=center| 1
| align=center| 1:49
| Luzhniki Sports Palace, Moscow, Russia
| 
|-
| Win
| align=center| 2–0
| Onassis Parungao
| TKO (knees)
| IAFC: Absolute Fighting Championship 1
| 
| align=center| 1
| align=center| 1:16
| Luzhniki Sports Palace, Moscow, Russia
| 
|-
| Win
| align=center| 1–0
| Alex Andrade
| TKO (submission to punches)
| IAFC: Absolute Fighting Championship 1
| 
| align=center| 1
| align=center| 1:48
| Luzhniki Sports Palace, Moscow, Russia
|

Submission grappling record 
{| class="wikitable sortable" style="font-size:80%; text-align:left;"
|-
| colspan=8 style="text-align:center;" |  ? Matches, ? Wins, ? Losses, ? Draws
|-
!  Result
!  Record
!  Opponent
!  Method
!  text-center| Event
!  Date
!  Location
|-
|  Loss ||align=center|7–3–0||  Rigan Machado || - || 2000 ADCC World Championships || March 1, 2000||  Abu Dhabi, United Arab Emirates
|-
|  Loss ||align=center|7–3–0||  Ricco Rodriguez || - || 2000 ADCC World Championships || March 1, 2000||  Abu Dhabi, United Arab Emirates
|-
|  Win ||align=center|7–2–0||  Mark Robinson || - || 2000 ADCC World Championships || March 1, 1999||  Abu Dhabi, United Arab Emirates
|-
|  Win ||align=center|6–2–0||  Carlos Clayton || - || 2000 ADCC World Championships || March 1, 1999||  Abu Dhabi, United Arab Emirates
|-
|  Win ||align=center|5–2–0||  Chris Haseman || Decision · Points || 1999 ADCC World Championships || February 24, 1999||  Abu Dhabi, United Arab Emirates
|-
|  Win ||align=center|4–2–0||  Tra Telligman || Decision · Points || 1999 ADCC World Championships || February 24, 1999||  Abu Dhabi, United Arab Emirates
|-
|  Loss ||align=center|3–2–0||  Mario Sperry || Decision || 1998 ADCC World Championships || March 20, 1998||  Abu Dhabi, United Arab Emirates
|-
|  Win ||align=center|3–1–0||  Joe Charles || Foot Lock · 7:33 · R1 || 1998 ADCC World Championships || March 20, 1998||  Abu Dhabi, United Arab Emirates
|-
|  Win ||align=center|2–1–0||  Toby Imada || Choke · 9:22 · R1 || 1998 ADCC World Championships || March 20, 1998 ||  Abu Dhabi, United Arab Emirates 
|-
|  Loss ||align=center|1–1–0||  Ricco Rodriguez   ||  Decision · Points|| 1998 ADCC World Championships ||  March 20, 1998 ||  Abu Dhabi, United Arab Emirates 
|-
|  Win ||align=center|1–0–0||  Salah Al Din ||  Armbar 5:24 · R1 || 1998 ADCC World Championships || March 20, 1998 ||  Abu Dhabi, United Arab Emirates 
|-

References

External links

Living people
Brazilian male mixed martial artists
Super heavyweight mixed martial artists
Mixed martial artists utilizing boxing
Mixed martial artists utilizing Brazilian jiu-jitsu
1967 births
Brazilian practitioners of Brazilian jiu-jitsu
Sportspeople from Rio de Janeiro (city)